The Little Chuckwalla Mountains are a mountain range in southeastern Riverside County, California. The range lies southeast of the Chuckwalla Mountains, north of the Chocolate Mountains and south of I-10.

Little Chuckwalla Mountains Wilderness
The Little Chuckwalla Mountains Wilderness was established in 1994 by the U.S. Congress and consists of 28,052 acres managed by the Bureau of Land Management.  This desert wilderness area protects the dry and rugged mountain range that rises to 2,100 feet (640 m). It is mostly in Riverside County with a small portion in Imperial County.

The area is habitat for desert bighorn sheep and the desert tortoise. Local vegetation includes California snakeweed, Alverson's foxtail cactus and the barrel cactus.

References 

Mountain ranges of Southern California
Mountain ranges of Riverside County, California
Wilderness areas of California

External links 
Little Chuckwalla Mountains Wilderness at the Bureau of Land Management